Gilberto Nascimento Silva (born 9 June 1956) is a Brazilian politician and lawyer. He has spent his political career representing São Paulo (state), having served as state representative since 2015.

Personal life
Prior to becoming a politician Nascimento worked as a lawyer. He is a member of the Assembleias de Deus church. Nascimento has been at times been criticized as an apologists of Silas Malafaia.

Political career
Nascimento voted in favor of the impeachment against then-president Dilma Rousseff and political reformation. He would later back Rousseff's successor Michel Temer against a similar impeachment motion, and also voted in favor of the Brazil labor reform (2017).

References

1956 births
Living people
People from São Paulo
Social Christian Party (Brazil) politicians
20th-century Brazilian lawyers
Brazilian Pentecostals
Assemblies of God people
Members of the Chamber of Deputies (Brazil) from São Paulo
Members of the Legislative Assembly of São Paulo